Indonesia participated in the 2017 Asian Indoor and Martial Arts Games in Ashgabat, Turkmenistan on 17–27 September 2017. Indonesia sent 99 athletes which competed in 12 sports.

Competitors

Medal summary

Medal table

Medalists

References

External links 
 NOC Overview - Indonesia 

Asian Indoor and Martial Arts Games
Asian Indoor and Martial Arts Games 2017
Indonesia
2017